Melaka FM (English: Malacca FM) is a regional Malay language radio station operated by Radio Televisyen Malaysia out of the state capital of Malacca, Malaysia. Transmissions started in 1946 from the Stadthuys building. Broadcasts are daily in Malay from 06:00 to 00:00 featuring local news and Malaysian music. It transmits on FM 102.3 MHz from Gunung Ledang. The Melaka FM transmissions were formerly on AM 1008 kHz, until 2002. It can be received statewide as well as in some parts of Johor, Negeri Sembilan, south west Pahang (Bandar Tun Abdul Razak and Bandar Muadzam Shah) and part of Selangor (Sungai Pelek and Tanjung Sepat).

Etymology 
The station was formerly known as Radio Malaysia Melaka and Radio 3 Melaka.

History 
Radio Malaya Malacca began its first broadcast from the Stadthuys in 1946, which is transmitted using a 25 watt powered transmission tower in Malacca City Centre. In 1948, it was moved to a wooden building in Bandar Hilir when Stadthuys was repurposed as a court building, and is transmitted using a 300 watt powered transmission tower at Malacca Straits Inn. Radio Malaya Malacca was rebranded as Radio Malaysia Melaka, when Malacca became a part of the newly formed Federation of Malaysia on 16 September 1963. Radio Malaysia Melaka moved to its present location at Jalan Mata Kuching (now Jalan Taming Sari), with the building officiated by then Yang di-Pertua Negeri of Malacca – Tun Haji Abdul Malek Yusof, on 17 August 1965 and broadcast using AM Frequency 1008 khz with a power of 10 kilowatt through a transmission tower located at Batu Berendam.

References

External links 
 

Radio stations in Malaysia
Malay-language radio stations
Mass media in Malacca City
Radio Televisyen Malaysia